Letícia Pinheiro de Novaes, best known as Letrux (born 5 January 1982), is a Brazilian singer-songwriter, actress and writer.

Biography
Born in Rio de Janeiro, Novaes studied acting at the Casa de Artes das Laranjeiras and literature at the Federal University of Rio de Janeiro. She approached music as a teenager, learning to play the guitar as a self-taught musician and founding the rock band Leticias and later the electronic music group Menage à trois. In 2008, she formed with her then boyfriend Lucas Vasconcellos the duo , with whom she recorded 3 albums.

In 2017, she embarked on a solo career, adopting the pseudonym Letrux. Her debut album, Letrux em Noite de Climão, won the Multishow Brazilian Music Award in the Best Album category. The album was also included in the list of the 10 best Brazilian albums of 2017 published by Rolling Stone. In 2020, she released her second album, Letrux aos Prantos; the album was nominated for Best Portuguese Language Rock or Alternative Album at the 21st Annual Latin Grammy Awards.

As an actress, Novaes took part to several films and TV-series starting from 2010. Also a writer, in 2015 she published a collection of poems entitled Zaralha: Abri a Minha Pasta.

Discography

With Letuce 
Plano de Fuga pra Cima dos Outros e de Mim (2009)
 Manja Perene (2012)
 Estilhaça (2015)

Solo albums     
 Studio albums  
Letrux em Noite de Climão (2017)
Letrux aos Prantos (2020)

 Live albums 
Letrux em Noite de Climão - Ao Vivo (2019)

 Collections
Letrux em Noite de Pistinha (2019)

References

External links
 
 
 

1982 births
Living people
Musicians from Rio de Janeiro (city)
Brazilian singer-songwriters
Brazilian film actresses
Brazilian television actresses
21st-century Brazilian singers
21st-century Brazilian women singers
Women in Latin music